Smerinthus cerisyi, the one-eyed sphinx or Cerisy's sphinx, is a moth of the family Sphingidae. The species was first described by William Kirby who named the species in honor of Alexandre Louis Lefèbvre de Cérisy in 1837.

Distribution 
It is known from south-eastern Alaska, the southern parts of all Canadian provinces and in the northern border states of the United States south into northern Indiana, Pennsylvania and Ohio and along the west coast to southern California, eastward to the Rocky Mountains and into western New Mexico north to western North Dakota. It has also been recorded from Illinois and as far south as Missouri.

Description 
The wingspan is about 95 mm. The species is found mostly in summer.

The larvae feed on willow (Salix) and poplar (Populus).

Taxonomy

Smerinthus ophthalmica, formerly listed as a synonym of Smerinthus cerisyi, is thought to be a valid species. In 2018, Smerinthus astarte was described as a separate species which was also formerly a synonym. It mostly replaces Smerinthus cerisyi in the west coast of the US.

See also
Smerinthus jamaicensis
Smerinthus saliceti
Smerinthus ocellata

References

External links

Smerinthus
Moths of North America
Natural history of the California chaparral and woodlands
Moths described in 1837
Taxa named by William Kirby (entomologist)